Preussen (Preußen in German and as written on the vessel) (PROY-sin) was a German steel-hulled, five-masted, ship-rigged sailing ship built in 1902 for the F. Laeisz shipping company and named after the German state and kingdom of Prussia. She was the world's only ship of this class with five masts, carrying six square sails on each mast.

Until the 2000 launch of Royal Clipper, a sail cruise liner, she was the only five-masted full-rigged ship ever built.

History
Preussen was built as hull-number 179 at the Joh. C. Tecklenborg ship yard in Geestemünde according to the plans of chief designer Dr.-Ing. h. c. Georg Wilhelm Claussen, launched and christened on 7 May 1902. The ship was commissioned on 31 July 1902 and left the harbour of Bremerhaven the same day on her maiden voyage to Iquique under the command of Capt. Boye Richard Petersen who assisted naval architect Claussen in his plans. The basic idea of building such a ship is said to come from famous Laeisz captain Robert Hilgendorf, commander of the five-masted steel barque Potosi. Story has it that Kaiser Wilhelm II, while visiting Potosi on 18 June 1899, asked Carl H. Laeisz when the five-masted full-rigged ship will finally "come". This inspired Laeisz to build the ship. The initial construction plans were found among the effects of Carl Ferdinand Laeisz, grandson of founder Ferdinand Laeisz and son of C. H. Laeisz, who died early at an age of 48 in 1900, even before his father Carl Heinrich Laeisz who died in 1901. The ship was subsequently ordered in November 1900.

The sturdily built ship could weather every storm and even tack in force 9 winds. In such conditions eight men had to hold the  double steering wheel. She was successfully used in the saltpeter trade with Chile, setting speed records in the process. Due to her appearance, uniqueness, and excellent sailing characteristics seamen called her the "Queen of the Queens of the Seas". In 1903 (2 February – 1 May) she sailed an unequalled record voyage from Lizard Point to Iquique in 57 days. She made twelve "round trips" (Hamburg–Chile and back home) and one journey round the world via New York and Yokohama, Japan in charter to the Standard Oil Co. When she entered New York harbour, almost all New Yorkers were "on their legs" to see and welcome that unique tall sailing ship. Capt. B. R. Petersen was accompanied by his wife and his little son; both left the ship and returned to Hamburg later by steamer. The mighty Preussen, as she was named by many seamen, had only two skippers in her career, Captain Boye Richard Petersen (11 voyages) and Captain Jochim Hans Hinrich Nissen (2 full voyages and the last). Both masters learned and developed their skills sailing such a huge sailing ship under Capt. Robert Hilgendorf, late master of Potosí.

Loss

Preussen was seriously damaged and lost much of her forward rigging (bowsprit, fore topgallant mast), making it impossible to steer the ship to safety. Brighton returned to Newhaven to summon aid and the tug Alert was sent to assist Preussen. A November gale thwarted attempts to sail or tug her to safety in Dover Harbour. It was intended to anchor her off Dover, but both anchor chains broke, and Preussen was driven onto rocks at Crab Bay, where she sank as a result of the damage inflicted on her. While crew, cargo and some equipment could be saved from Preussen, with the keel broken she was rendered unsalvageable. The Master of Brighton was found to be responsible for the accident and lost his licence as a result. A few ribs of Preussen can be seen off Crab Bay at low spring tides.

Technical data
Preussen was steel-built with a waterline length of 124 m and a total hull length of 132 m. The five masts were fully rigged, with courses, upper and lower topsails, upper and lower topgallant sails, and royals. Not only the hull was steel: masts (lower and top mast were made in one piece) and spars (yard, spanker boom) were constructed of steel tubing, and most of the rigging was steel cable. All bobstays between jibboom and bow were made of massive steel rods and chains. The only wooden spar was the gaff of the small spanker. The hoistable yards were equipped with special shoes to slide in rails riveted to the masts. "Jarvis' Patent" brace winches for the lower and top-sail yards were mounted before each of the five masts. The fall winches were of "Hall's Patent".

The names of the five masts were Fockmast, Grossmast, Mittelmast, Laeiszmast (after her owner), Kreuzmast.

She was designed as a so-called "three-island ship", i. e. a ship with a third "high level deck" amidships beside the forecastle and poop decks. The midship island, also called the midship bridge, is also called a "Liverpool house", because the first ships equipped with that feature came from Liverpool yards. Dry and well-ventilated accommodations for crew, mates, and captain, as well as the pantry and chart room, were built in this middle deck. The main helm — a double rudder wheel of 6.2 ft (1.89 m) diameter with a steam driven rudder machine — was mounted on top of it, well protected against the dangerous huge waves from aft. A second helm (emergency helm) was near the stern. Four huge main hatches were set in the upper main deck. Behind the foremast a little deckhouse contained the two donkey boilers that drove four steam winches, a steam capstan, the rudder machine, and a generator for electricity. Four lifeboats with davits were securely fixed on a tubing rack above the main deck before the aftmost mast.

Her best 24-hour runs were 392 nm in 1908 on her voyage to Japan and 426 nm in 1904 in the South Pacific. Preussen was manned by a crew of 45, which was supported by two steam engines powering the pumps, the rudder steering engine, the loading gear, and winches. English seamen estimate her the fastest sailing ship after the clipper era, even faster than her fleet sister Potosí. Only a few clippers were faster than Preussen, and they had considerably less cargo capacity.

Stamps

Preussen has appeared on postage stamps issued by the Falkland Islands, Germany, Grenada, Paraguay and Sierra Leone.

See also
List of large sailing vessels

References

Further reading
 Oliver E. Allen: Die Windjammer, Time-Life Books, 1980 (Original US edition: The Windjammers, 1978)
 Heinz Blöß: Glanz und Schicksal der "Potosi" und "Preußen", Hamburgs und der Welt größte Segler. Schmidt Verlag, Kiel 1960
 Jochen Brennecke: Windjammer.  Der große Bericht über die Entwicklung, Reisen und Schicksale der "Königinnen der Sieben Meere". Koehlers Verlagsgesellschaft, Herford, 3. Aufl. 1984; Kap. XXII - Die Größten unter den Segelschiffen der Welt, S. 291-297; 
 Hans-Jörg Furrer: Die Vier- und Fünfmast-Rahsegler der Welt.  Koehlers Verlagsgesellschaft, Herford 1984, pp 168, 
 Horst Hamecher: Fünfmast-Vollschiff »PREUSSEN«, Königin der See. Der Lebensweg eines Tiefwasserseglers.  Hamecher Eigenverlag, Kassel 1993, ill.;  (the book describes in detail everything concerning the ship including all her voyages)
 W. Kaemmerer: Das Fünfmast-Vollschiff Preußen, erbaut von Joh. C. Tecklenborg A.-G., Schiffswerft und Maschinenfabrik in Bremerhaven-Geestemünde.  Zeitschrift der Vereins deutscher Ingenieure, vol. 48, No. 34, Berlin 1904
 Peter Klingbeil: Die Flying P-Liner. Die Segelschiffe der Reederei F. Laeisz.  Verlag "Die Hanse", Hamburg 1998 / 2000; 
 Björn Landström: Das Schiff.  C. Bertelsmann Verlag, München (Munich) 1961
 Hans Georg Prager: „F. Laeisz“ vom Frachtsegler bis zum Bulk Carrier.  Koehlers Verlagsgesellschaft mbH, Herford 1974; 
 Manfred Prager: Vergleich zwischen dem Fünfmastvollschiff  "Preußen" und der Fünfmastbark  "Potosi" auf den Reisen nach der Westküste Südamerikas und zurück. Annalen der Hydrographie und maritimen Meteorologie: Zeitschrift für Seefahrt und Meereskunde, Hamburg, Berlin 1908; ISSN 0174-8114
 Schiff und Zeit. Fachzeitschrift der Deutschen Gesellschaft für Schiffahrts- und Marinegeschichte. Fünfmastvollschiff  "Preußen". Heft 5/1977, Herford 1977, Bestell-Nr.: 5872
 Jens Jansson: SOS - Schicksale deutscher Schiffe - Weiße Segel über blauen Wogen - vol. Nr. 51 - Fünfmastvollschiff  "Preußen".   pp 2, Pabel-Moewig Verlag KG, Rastatt 1976
Rolf Christian Warming: "I was at the helm when Preussen ran aground", Mariner's Mirror (101:3): pp. 323–333. 2015.

External links

 Description with ship characteristics & photographs 
 Preußen at www.bruzelius.info
 Profile of Preußen 
 Description with ship characteristics, photographs, report on the accident 
 CapHorniers on F. Laeisz (and A. D. Bordes & Fils), Chile, photographs etc.
 1/48 scale model of Preussen at the San Francisco Maritime Museum
 Preußen, un genuino windjammer 

Tall ships of Germany
Shipwrecks in the English Channel
Maritime incidents in 1910
Five-masted ships
Wreck diving sites in England
1902 ships
Ships sunk in collisions
Ships built in Bremen (state)
Lost sailing vessels
1910 in England
Windjammers